The 1985 Virginia Slims of Florida, also known as the VS of Florida, was a women's tennis tournament played on outdoor hard courts in Key Biscayne, Florida in the United States that was part of the 1984 Virginia Slims World Championship Series. It was the seventh edition of the tournament and was played from January 21 through January 27, 1985. Second-seeded Chris Evert-Lloyd won the singles title.

Finals

Singles
 Chris Evert-Lloyd defeated  Martina Navratilova 6–2, 6–4
 It was Evert-Lloyd's 1st singles title of the year and the 133rd of her career.

Doubles
 Kathy Jordan /  Elizabeth Smylie defeated  Svetlana Parkhomenko /  Larisa Neiland 6–4 7–6

See also
 Evert–Navratilova rivalry

Notes

References

External links
 ITF tournament edition details
 Tournament draws

Virginia Slims of Florida
Virginia Slims Of Florida, 1985
Virginia Slims of Florida
Virginia Slims of Florida
Virginia Slims of Florida